Konrad Affolter (born 17 May 1954) is a Swiss handball player. He competed in the 1980 Summer Olympics.

References

1954 births
Living people
Handball players at the 1980 Summer Olympics
Swiss male handball players
Olympic handball players of Switzerland